The Finnish Athletics Championships, which are known as Kalevan kisat in Finnish, were first held in Tampere in 1907. Since then, they have been held in a different location every year. In the beginning, women were not allowed to compete in the Finnish Championships.

The Kaleva Cup
In 1909, the personnel at the life insurance company Kaleva donated a trophy called the Kalevan malja or the Kaleva Cup to be awarded to and kept for until the next Championships by the team accumulating the most points during the competition.

In 1909, the Finnish Championships started to be informally referred to as the Kaleva Games because of the name of the cup. At the Championships held in Pori in 1915, the magazine Suomen Urheilulehti started to call the competition the Kaleva Games in its headlines. In 1937, at the Championships held in Vyborg, the Finnish athletics federation called Finnish Athletics (Suomen Urheiluliitto in Finnish) formally declared the name of the Finnish Championships to be the Kaleva Games.

History

Championships records

Women

See also
Finnish records in athletics

References

External links
 
 Finnish Athletics

 
Recurring sporting events established in 1907
National athletics competitions
Athletics competitions in Finland